The siege of Ravenna was a military engagement from 490–493, when Theodoric besieged Odoacer in Ravenna. The siege ended when the two men agreed to peace, but on 15 March 493 CE, Theodoric murdered Odoacer during a banquet.

References 

Ravenna 490–493
Ravenna
490s conflicts
Ravenna 490-493
Theoderic the Great
Ravenna